Vosava is a village in Minsk District, Minsk Region, Belarus.

External links
maps.by

Villages in Belarus
Populated places in Minsk Region
Minsk District